Bilice is a village and a municipality in Šibenik-Knin County, Croatia.

External links
Information
 Bilice

Municipalities of Croatia
Populated places in Šibenik-Knin County